Yichang South railway station is a freight-only railway station on the Yichang-Wanzhou Railway. It is located in  Dianjun District of the city of Yichang, in Hubei Province of People's Republic of China. In early design documents it was called Dianjun Station.

Service
Freight only.

History
It's still under construction.

Notes

Railway stations in Hubei